Ezechiel Joseph is a Saint Lucian politician and former representative for the constituency of Babonneau and senator, for the United Workers Party in the House of Assembly. Joseph served as the Minister of Agriculture, Fisheries, Physical Planning, Natural Resources and Co-operatives in his 2016 - 2021 tenure. Joseph lost his seat in the 2021 Saint Lucian General Election dubbed a landslide victory for the Saint Lucia Labour Party.

Political career 
Joseph represented the constituency of Babonneau for the United Workers Party from 2006 to 2011 and from 2016 to 2021. Joseph won the seat at the general election held on 11 December 2006. In the government of Prime Minister John Compton, sworn in on 19 December 2006, he was appointed Minister for Agriculture, Forestry and Fisheries. Joseph lost the seat at the general election held on 28 November 2011. He was sworn in as an opposition member of the Senate on 5 January 2012. He resigned from the Senate effective 31 December 2015. Joseph regained the Babonneau seat in the general election held on 6 June 2016 and served again as Minister for Agriculture.  He was lost the seat again in the 2021 general election.

References

Agriculture ministers
Government ministers of Saint Lucia
Living people
Members of the House of Assembly of Saint Lucia
Members of the Senate of Saint Lucia
United Workers Party (Saint Lucia) politicians
Year of birth missing (living people)